Late Night Tales and its predecessor Another Late Night are the names of two related series of artist-curated compilation albums released by Azuli Records in the UK until 2009 when the independent record label Night Time Stories took over the series. Both series were started by the author A.W. Wilde. The tracks on the albums are selected and mixed by a diverse selection of artists asked by Late Night Tales to create the ultimate late night mix. Many of the albums end with a story track, read by famous English performers including Benedict Cumberbatch, Will Self, Brian Blessed and Patrick Moore. With the exception of Jamiroquai, Air, Bill Brewster, and Don Letts' contributions, each release includes a cover version recorded by the artist(s).

The series has been met with critical acclaim, with GQ magazine praising Late Night Tales as "The Rolls Royce of compilations". 2011 saw the label celebrate their 10th anniversary with a box set including all albums to date. Friendly Fires' compilation released in November 2012 marked the 30th in the series.

Albums

See also 

 Back to Mine
 DJ-Kicks
 Fabric discography
 Solid Steel

References

External links 

  of Late Night Tales
  of Night Time Stories
 

 
DJ mix album series
Compilation album series